The Polytechnic Institute of Viana do Castelo (Instituto Politécnico de Viana do Castelo) is a state-run polytechnic institute of higher education in Portugal. Its five schools are located in several cities of the Viana do Castelo district in Portugal. It was established on 16 August 1980.

Schools 

 Escola Superior de Educação (Viana do Castelo)
 Escola Superior Agrária (Ponte de Lima)
 Escola Superior de Tecnologia e Gestão (Viana do Castelo)
 Escola Superior de Enfermagem (Viana do Castelo)
 Escola Superior de Ciências Empresariais (Valença)

External links 
 IPVC — Instituto Politécnico de Viana do Castelo 

Polytechnics in Portugal
Educational institutions established in 1980
1980 establishments in Portugal
Buildings and structures in Viana do Castelo